The 1996 WDF Europe Cup was the 10th edition of the WDF Europe Cup darts tournament, organised by the World Darts Federation. It was held in Bundoran, Ireland from 9 to 12 October.

Entered Teams

24 countries/associations entered a team in the event

Darts tournaments